Poi is a traditional Samoan dessert made from mashing overripe bananas with coconut milk into a smooth paste. The dessert is usually eaten chilled, traditionally by mixing cold water into the paste, with modern recipes using crushed ice instead. Vanilla, lemon and sugar can also be added to enhance the flavour.

See also
 Po‘e – A similar Polynesian dessert made from bananas, but with a more solid consistency.
 Poi – A fermented mashed paste made from taro, eaten by the Native Hawaiians.
 List of desserts

References

Samoan cuisine
Banana dishes
Fruit dishes
Foods containing coconut
Polynesian cuisine